Coastal Christian School may refer to:

Coastal Christian School (California)
Coastal Christian School (Maine)